Orkhan Ibadov (born 20 June 1998) is a Ukrainian football defender of Azerbaijani origin.

Career
Ibadov is a product of the different Ukrainian youth sportive schools.

In September 2017 he signed a contract with FC Arsenal Kyiv in the Ukrainian First League.

References

External links

1998 births
Living people
Ukrainian footballers
Ukrainian people of Azerbaijani descent
Association football defenders
FC Arsenal Kyiv players
FC Mynai players
FC Lyubomyr Stavyshche players
Ukrainian First League players
Ukrainian Second League players
Ukrainian Amateur Football Championship players